The Girl with the Wine Glass (Dame en twee heren) is an oil on canvas painting by Johannes Vermeer, created c. 1659–1660, now in the Herzog Anton Ulrich Museum, in Braunschweig.

Painting materials
The pigment analysis done by Hermann Kühn shows Vermeer's use of the expensive natural ultramarine in the tablecloth, lead-tin-yellow in the oranges on the table and madder lake and vermilion in the skirt of the woman.

Notes

Further reading

External links
 
 

Genre paintings by Johannes Vermeer
1660 paintings
Food and drink paintings
Paintings in the collection of the Herzog Anton Ulrich Museum